Elisha Lawrence (1746July 23, 1799) was an American Federalist Party politician, who represented Monmouth County in the New Jersey Legislative Council, the precursor to the New Jersey State Senate, from 1780 through 1783, from 1789 through 1792 and in 1795. He served as Vice-President of Council from 1789 through 1792, and again in 1795. He served as acting governor of New Jersey in 1790.

Political career 
As vice president, he was the acting governor of New Jersey from July 25, 1790, when governor William Livingston died, to October 30, 1790. He was succeeded as governor by William Paterson.

A resident of Upper Freehold Township, Lawrence was serving as a Justice of the Peace as early as 1788, and sat with the County Board of Justices and Freeholders, the precursor to the Board of Chosen Freeholders, the governing body of the county. He was chairman of the board from May 1795 to May 1796.

Death 
Lawrence is buried at the Yellow Meeting House Cemetery in Red Valley, New Jersey.  The tombstone reads, “A stranger to all ambition but that of being useful, he was twice vice president of New Jersey for several years presiding judge of the pleas, and after a series of faithful and gallant services in the Revolutionary War he was appointed by his county brigadier general of the Monmouth militia of the surveyed blazing line when wars loud conflict racked the brain. Now sheltered in the realms divine he treads heavens ever-peaceful plan lead on by softer, mercy’s mildest ray while fellow warriors hail him on his way.” The bottom of the stone reads, “By indulgence of the general’s family, his companions in arms erect this tribute of affection the first day of January 1800.”

See also
List of Monmouth County Freeholder Directors
List of governors of New Jersey
List of sheriffs of Monmouth County, New Jersey

Notes and references

External links
 

1746 births
1799 deaths
Governors of New Jersey
Members of the New Jersey Legislative Council
County commissioners in New Jersey
New Jersey Federalists
People from Upper Freehold Township, New Jersey
Federalist Party state governors of the United States
People of colonial New Jersey
Burials in New Jersey
18th-century American politicians